The Monstrumologist is a young adult horror novel written by American author Rick Yancey. It was published on September 22, 2009 by Simon & Schuster Children's Publishing. It is the first book in The Monstrumologist series, followed by The Curse of the Wendigo. The story follows Will Henry, an orphaned assistant to Dr. Pellinore Warthrop, a man who specializes in monstrumology, the study of monsters.

The novel received the 2010 Michael L. Printz Honor Award for excellence in young adult literature.

Reception
The review in Publishers Weekly said, "Yancey's elegant depiction of an America plagued with monsters, human and otherwise, spares no grisly detail. ... Horror lovers will be rapt." The reviewer in the School Library Journal wrote "Though the pace sometimes falters beneath the weight of Will's verbose observations, the author folds surprising depth and twists into the plot and cast alike, crafts icky bits that can be regarded as comically over-the-top (or not), and all in all dishes up an escapade fully 'capable,' as Will puts it, 'of fulfilling our curious and baffling need for a marauding horror of malicious intent'".

Sequels
The monstrumologist had three  subsequent books in the saga. These books are The Curse of the Wendigo published in 2010, The Isle of Blood published in 2011 and The Final Descent in 2013.

References

American young adult novels
American horror novels
2009 American novels